The Newton County School District is a public school district based in Decatur, Mississippi (USA).

In addition to Decatur, the district also serves the towns of Hickory, Chunky, Little Rock, the community of Conehatta, and much of the Newton County portion of Lake.

Schools
Newton County High School
Newton County Elementary School

Demographics

2006-07 school year
There were a total of 7000 students enrolled in the Newton County School District during the 2006–2007 school year. The gender makeup of the district was 47% female and 53% male. The racial makeup of the district was 23.88% African American, 72.00% White, 2.54% Native American, 1.32% Hispanic, and 0.26% Asian. 38.2% of the district's students were eligible to receive free lunch.

Previous school years

Accountability statistics

See also
List of school districts in Mississippi

References

External links
 

Education in Newton County, Mississippi
School districts in Mississippi